Fred Wendt (July 15, 1924  – May 18, 2020) was an American football player.  He played college football for the UTEP Miners football team. He led the NCAA major colleges in rushing yardage with 1,570 rushing yards in 1948. His total of 1,570 rushing yards in 1948 broke the national collegiate rushing record of 1,281 yards set by Rudy Mobley in 1942. Wendt's rushing record stood for 20 years until broken in 1968 by O. J. Simpson.  Wendt also broke the NCAA single-season scoring record with 152 points in 10 games, including 32 place-kicking points.  He did not play during the 1949 season due to a leg injury and was signed by the Chicago Cardinals of the National Football League in April 1950.

Wendt died on May 18, 2020.

See also
 List of NCAA major college football yearly rushing leaders
 List of NCAA major college football yearly scoring leaders

References

American football halfbacks
UTEP Miners football players
Players of American football from New Mexico
Sportspeople from Las Cruces, New Mexico
Players of American football from El Paso, Texas
1924 births
2020 deaths